Portland Public Schools is the public school district in Portland, Maine, United States. The district operates eighteen primary and secondary schools.  It is the largest and most ethnically diverse school district in Maine, with a student body made up of roughly 49% minorities.  The district operates expeditionary learning schools, a vocational school, and elementary, middle, and three high schools (Casco Bay High School, Deering High School, and Portland High School).

Demographics
The school district is the most diverse in the state. In 2021, about 49 percent of the district’s approximately 6,500 students identified as people of color, while about 11 percent of staff do. About one-third of the district’s students come from homes where languages other than English are spoken. More than 60 languages are spoken by the student body. In total, 52 percent of the district’s students are white and 48 percent are students of color. Approximately half of the district's students qualify for free or reduced-price school meals. In 2021, the district received a $25,000 grant from the Barr Foundation to recruit a more diverse staff.

List of schools
Superintendent of Schools: Xavier Botana

Elementary schools (K-5)

 Amanda C. Rowe Elementary School
Cliff Island School
 East End Community School
 Henry W. Longfellow Elementary School
 Harrison Lyseth Elementary School
 Ocean Avenue Elementary School
 Peaks Island School
 Presumpscot Elementary School
 Howard C. Reiche Community School
 Gerald E. Talbot Community School

Middle schools (6–8)
 King Middle School
 Lincoln Middle School
 Lyman Moore Middle School

High schools (9–12)
 Portland High School, founded in 1821 Portland High School is the second oldest still operating public high school in the United States of America.
 Deering High School, in 2017 Architectural Digest named Deering High School one of the most beautiful high schools in the United States of America
 Portland Arts and Technology
 Casco Bay High School

Former schools
 Fred P. Hall Elementary School
Jack Elementary School, Munjoy Hill
 Marada Adams School, Munjoy Hill
 Baxter Elementary School, Back Cove
 Nathan Clifford School, Portland
 Rosa True School, Arts District / West End
 Morrill School
 North School
 Roosevelt School

Food service 
The Portland Public Schools prepare food at a central kitchen. The school department provides hot lunches for about 2,200 elementary students per day. In 2011, the Portland Public Schools added a daily vegetarian cold lunch option to its school menus. In 2019, the district changed to a daily hot vegan school meal option. The food service director said the vegan options were added to serve the schools' diverse student body.

References

External links
 

Education in Portland, Maine
Government of Portland, Maine
School districts in Maine
Educational institutions in the United States with year of establishment missing
1733 establishments in the British Empire